Tongnan railway station is a railway station located in Tongnan District, Chongqing, People's Republic of China, on the Suiyu railway which is operated by the China Railway Corporation.

History
It's still under construction.

Railway stations in Chongqing